One Grand Central Place, originally the Lincoln Building, is a 53-story,  tall neo-Gothic office building at 60 East 42nd Street in Midtown Manhattan, New York City. It is bounded by Madison Avenue to the west, East 41st Street to the south, and Park Avenue to the east. One Grand Central Place is near other skyscrapers such as the Chrysler Building, MetLife Building, and One Vanderbilt. It has direct in-building access to Grand Central Terminal to the north. As of 2021, it is the 91st-tallest building in the city, tied with the 277 Fifth Avenue, Barclay Tower, and One Court Square. The building is assigned its own ZIP Code, 10165; it was one of 41 buildings in Manhattan that had their own ZIP Codes .

Description and history
Designed by architect Kenneth Norton of James Edwin Ruthven Carpenter Jr., the skyscraper was completed in 1930 as the Lincoln Building. Among the building's features are the Gothic windows at the top. In June 2009, the Lincoln Building was renamed One Grand Central Place, and it underwent a $85 million renovation, which included new windows, renovated elevators, renovated air-conditioned public corridors and restrooms, and upgraded building-wide systems.

In March 2020, One Grand Central Place had New York's first reported person-to-person spread of SARS-CoV-2 during the COVID-19 pandemic.

Abraham Lincoln sculpture 
In 1956, Lawrence Wien paid his daughter, Margaret French Cresson, $3,000 to acquire Daniel Chester French's  bronze model of Abraham Lincoln, a cast of one of the sketches used to create the statue for the Lincoln Memorial. Wien put the sculpture on display in the visitor's center in the lobby. When the building was renamed One Grand Central Place in 2009, the model was removed and loaned to Chesterwood estate in Stockbridge, Massachusetts. It was returned to the lobby on April 15, 2015.

See also 

 Architecture of New York City
 List of tallest buildings in New York City

References

External links 

One Grand Central Place

1930 establishments in New York City
42nd Street (Manhattan)
COVID-19 pandemic in New York City
Gothic Revival architecture in New York City
Gothic Revival skyscrapers
Grand Central Terminal
Monuments and memorials to Abraham Lincoln in the United States
Office buildings completed in 1930
Skyscraper office buildings in Manhattan